Eocarterus esau is a species of ground beetle in the genus Eocarterus. It was discovered by the zoologist Heyden in 1885.

References

esau
Beetles described in 1885